Brooksby House Hospital is a community hospital in the North Ayrshire region in Scotland. It is managed by NHS Ayrshire and Arran. It is a Category A listed building.

History 
The house was designed by David Hamilton and built as a yachting residence for Matthew Preston, a Glasgow businessman. It was acquired as a convalescent home for the Glasgow Victoria Infirmary in 1896 and officially opened by Lady Watson in June 1897.

The Brooksby Resource Centre, which offers both health services and local council services, was opened at Brooksby House by Nicola Sturgeon, Deputy First Minister, in 2009.

Notes

References 

Hospitals in North Ayrshire
NHS Ayrshire and Arran
NHS Scotland hospitals